These are the official results of the Women's 10 km Walk event at the 1995 World Championships held on Monday 7 August 1995 in Gothenburg, Sweden. There were a total number of 45 participating athletes.

Medalists

Abbreviations
All times shown are in hours:minutes:seconds

Intermediates

Final ranking

See also
 1992 Women's Olympic 10km Walk (Barcelona)
 1993 Women's World Championships 10km Walk (Stuttgart)
 1994 Women's European Championships 10km Walk (Helsinki)
 1996 Women's Olympic 10km Walk (Atlanta)
 1997 Women's World Championships 10km Walk (Athens)
 1998 Women's European Championships 10km Walk (Budapest)

References
 Results
 Die Leichtathletik-Statistik-Seite

W
Racewalking at the World Athletics Championships
1995 in women's athletics